Jarid Lukosevicius (born February 5, 1995) is a Canadian professional ice hockey right wing who currently plays for the Belleville Senators in the American Hockey League (AHL). He was named as the NCAA Tournament Most Outstanding Player for Denver during the program's national championship in 2017.

Playing career
Lukosevicius began his college career in the fall of 2015 and had a fairly pedestrian freshman season. Though he did not contribute much offensively, Lukosevicius did help the Pioneers reach the Frozen Four. Lukosevicius found his game as a sophomore, more than tripling his point production and helped lead Denver to its first conference title in seven years. While Denver fell in the NCHC semifinals, the team's record was still strong enough to earn them the top overall seed for the NCAA Tournament. Lukosevicius scored twice in the regional final against Penn State, including the game-winner, but it was in the National championship match where he came to life. In a just less than 8 minute span in the second period, Lukosevicius scored three goals to give Denver a lead it would ride to the end. Lukosevicius' hat-trick was the first in a championship game since 1993 which, coincidentally, was recorded by his coach, Jim Montgomery.

As an upperclassmen, Lukosevicius remained one of Denver's top goal scorers, leading the Pioneers with 19 as a senior. That season, he helped DU return to the Frozen Four but the team's run was undone by a poor special teams play. After finishing up his college career, Lukosevicius signed with the Grand Rapids Griffins and made his professional debut during the 2019 Calder Cup playoffs. He spent the next two seasons with Grand Rapids but could not find any consistent playing time. He played just 46 games with the Griffins and though much of that can be attributed to the COVID-shortened season in 2021, he wasn't able to demonstrate his scoring touch in those appearances. Lukosevicius returned to western Canada when he signed a 1-year contract with the Abbotsford Canucks for the 2022 season.

Career statistics

Awards and honors

References

External links

1995 births
Living people
Abbotsford Canucks players
Belleville Senators players
Canadian ice hockey right wingers
Denver Pioneers men's ice hockey players
Grand Rapids Griffins players
Ice hockey people from British Columbia
People from Squamish, British Columbia
Powell River Kings players
South Carolina Stingrays players